Skagit may refer to:

Skagit peoples, Native American groups in the U.S. state of Washington
Upper Skagit, one of the two Skagit peoples
Lower Skagit, one of the two Skagit peoples
Skagit language, or Lushootseed, the traditional language of the Skagit peoples
Skagit Bay
Skagit County, Washington
Skagit Range
Skagit River
Skagit River Hydroelectric Project
Skagit Valley